Typeface (Gordon Thomas) is a fictional character appearing in American comic books published by Marvel Comics. He first appeared in Peter Parker: Spider-Man vol. 2 #23 (November 2000), and was created by Paul Jenkins and Mark Buckingham.

Fictional character biography
What little is known about Typeface's past is seen in flashback. In his civilian life as Gordon Thomas, he fights in an unknown war for the US Army in which he loses his brother Joey. Upon his return to America, Gordon's wife leaves him and takes their son with her.

Feeling outcast, Gordon becomes a signsmith. He is happy for a time until a man named George Finch buys the company he is working for, Ace Signs, and Gordon is laid off. Gordon starts to hate everything that went wrong in his life and decides to become a super-villain, calling himself Typeface. He uses a grease pencil to write letters on his face, including a large, red "R" on his forehead, for "retribution". He begins committing vandalism throughout the city, and while attacking local thugs, he catches the attention of Spider-Man. Typeface uses his giant letters as weapons and manages to defeat the webslinger. After successfully escaping and returning to his apartment, he replaces the "R" letter on his head with an "A" for "Annihilation".

Thomas later seeks revenge against George Finch, but is stopped by Spider-Man. Typeface wants to kill Spider-Man for intervening, but when he sees the webslinger being attacked by the Spider-Hybrid, he has a flashback to the words his brother Joey once gave him: "Just live, man." Typeface decides to help Spider-Man defeat the Spider-Hybrid, and renounces his desire to kill Finch. However, Finch decides to exact revenge on Typeface for humiliating him, and finds the bombs Thomas would have used to kill him. Finch sets them off and demolishes an entire building, killing himself, and for a time it was believed that Typeface died in the explosion. When the police arrive, they declare Typeface responsible for the explosion.

Mysterious reappearance
Having survived the explosion, Typeface becomes a vigilante. He wages war against a gang called the "Penny-Ante Brigade". After taking out the gang (and another vigilante, Spellcheck, inspired by Typeface), Typeface mimics Spider-Man's note to police, left when he apprehends criminals: "Compliments from your friendly neighborhood Typeface."

Civil War

Returning in Marvel's Civil War: Front Line, Typeface has chosen to side against the Superhuman Registration Act. He joins a small resistance cell that includes Battlestar, Gladiatrix, and Solo. During a visit by the reporter Sally Floyd, he talks about how he had held his brother who had died in a foreign country, Typeface feels his brother had died in the cause of freedom and this had motivated him to oppose the act. Iron Man and S.H.I.E.L.D. agents attack, capturing many members of the group. Floyd and others escape.

The prisoners are taken to a maximum security prison built in the Negative Zone called "Fantasy Island". While transferring, Typeface befriends Robbie Baldwin, otherwise known as Speedball. Both are concerned over the fate of a fellow prisoner adversely affected by the very nature of the Negative Zone.

According to writer Paul Jenkins, he "may not survive the series," but when he dies his eyes will be covered by "little X's". In Civil War: Frontline #10 he is slammed into a bus by Venom during the final battle. A quick examination of Typeface by a fleeing Ben Urich leads the Daily Bugle reporter to believe he is dead. Sally Floyd also witnesses the murder. Post-death, Typeface's eyes were not seen.

In Civil War: Frontline #11, he is carried away in a stretcher, with the sheet pulled over all but his letter-covered arm.

A recovered Typeface is later shown among the patrons of an underground casino that Spider-Man, Deadpool, and Saturn visit on Christmas.

Reception
 In 2020, CBR.com ranked Typeface 10th in their "Marvel: 10 Famous Villains From The 2000s To Bring Back" list.

References

External links
 
 Typeface on the Marvel Universe Character Bio Wiki

Comics characters introduced in 2000
Fictional Vietnam War veterans
Fictional United States Army personnel
Marvel Comics military personnel
Marvel Comics superheroes
Marvel Comics supervillains
Vigilante characters in comics